Hans Georg Conried Jr. (April 15, 1917 – January 5, 1982) was an American actor and comedian. He was known for providing the voices of George Darling and Captain Hook in Walt Disney's Peter Pan (1953), Snidely Whiplash in Jay Ward's Dudley Do-Right cartoons, Professor Waldo P. Wigglesworth in Ward's Hoppity Hooper cartoons, was host of Ward's "Fractured Flickers" and Professor Kropotkin on the radio and film versions of My Friend Irma. He also appeared as Uncle Tonoose on Danny Thomas' sitcom Make Room for Daddy, and twice on I Love Lucy.

Early life
Conried was born on April 15, 1917, in Baltimore, Maryland to parents Edith Beryl (née Gildersleeve) and Hans Georg Conried. His Connecticut-born mother was a descendant of Pilgrims, and his father was a Jewish immigrant from Vienna, Austria. He was raised in Baltimore and in New York City.

He studied acting at Columbia University and went on to play major classical roles onstage. Conried worked in radio before turning to movies in 1939. During World War II, he enlisted in the U.S. Army in September 1944.

Conried trained at Fort Knox as a tank crewman until the army decided he was too tall. He became a heavy mortar crewman then was sent to the Philippines as an engineer laborer until fellow actor Jack Kruschen obtained his release for service with the Armed Forces Radio Network.

Career

Radio career and other voice work
One of Conried's early radio appearances came in 1937, when he appeared in a supporting role in a broadcast of The Taming of the Shrew on KECA in Los Angeles, California. Four years later, a newspaper reported about his role on Hedda Hopper's Hollywood: "But at the mike, he's equally convincing as old men, drunks, dialeticians, or Shakesperean tragedians. Miss Hopper favors him for her dramatizations when the script will allow him, as she puts it, 'to have his head.'"

Conried appeared regularly on radio during the 1940s and 1950s. He was in the regular cast of Orson Welles' Ceiling Unlimited, for which he wrote the December 14, 1942, episode, "War Workers". On The George Burns and Gracie Allen Show, he played a psychiatrist whom George regularly consults for help in dealing with the ditzy Gracie.
Conried was also a regular on the CBS Radio program, Life with Luigi, portraying Schultz, a German classmate.

Even as a younger man, Conried appeared much older than his actual age and he was frequently cast as middle-aged or even elderly pompous scholarly types. His inimitable growl and impeccable diction were well-suited to the roles he played, whether portraying the dim Professor Kropotkin in the radio show My Friend Irma or as comic villains and mock-sinister or cranky types, such as Mr. Darling and Captain Hook in Walt Disney's Peter Pan (following the tradition of having both characters portrayed by the same actor), and The Grinch/Narrator from Dr. Seuss' Halloween Is Grinch Night. According to the DVD commentary of Futurama, he was the inspiration for the voice created for Robot Devil. He was a live action model reference for King Stefan in Sleeping Beauty and, though he was replaced by Taylor Holmes for the voice role of Stefan, he recorded a few dialogues.

Conried was a cast member of other Dr. Seuss specials and The Rocky and Bullwinkle Show, voicing the character of Snidely Whiplash in the Dudley Do-Right segments, a creation of Jay Ward and Bill Scott, as well as Wally Walrus on The Woody Woodpecker Show, Professor Waldo P.  Wigglesworth on Hoppity Hooper, and Dr. Dred on Drak Pack.

TV appearances

From 1955 to 1964, Conried made 19 guest appearances as "Uncle Tonoose" in Make Room for Daddy on ABC and then CBS, and four appearances as other characters.

He was featured in the 1958 episode, "What Makes Opera Grand?", on the anthology series Omnibus. The episode, an analysis by Leonard Bernstein, showing the powerful effect of music in opera, featured Conried as Marcello in a spoken dramatization of Act III of Puccini's La Bohème. The program demonstrated the effect of the music in La Bohème by having actors speak portions of the libretto in English, followed by opera singers singing the same lines in the original Italian.

Conried hosted several episodes of Walt Disney's Wonderful World of Color as the Magic Mirror from Snow White and the Seven Dwarfs. He was a regular guest on Jack Paar's Tonight Show from 1959 to 1962. Besides hosting Jay Ward's Fractured Flickers, he was a regular panelist on the pantomime program Stump the Stars and a semi-regular guest on the Ernie Kovacs-hosted game show Take a Good Look. Conried joined the cast of The Tony Randall Show during the 1977–78 season.

His many guest appearances included I Love Lucy, Davy Crockett, The Californians, Hey, Jeannie!, The Ray Milland Show, The DuPont Show with June Allyson, The Real McCoys, The Many Loves of Dobie Gillis, Mister Ed, The Islanders, Ben Casey, Dr. Kildare, Lost in Space, Daniel Boone, The Beverly Hillbillies, The Lucy Show, Gilligan's Island, The Monkees, Have Gun – Will Travel, Love, American Style, Here's Lucy, Kolchak, Alice, Laverne & Shirley, The Love Boat, Hogan's Heroes, Match Game, Maverick, The Donna Reed Show, Fantasy Island, and Quark.

Live action film and stage appearances
Conried made his Broadway debut in the Cole Porter musical Can-Can, where he played a struggling artist and sang two musical numbers. In 1971, he appeared in 70, Girls, 70 and two years later was a replacement performer in the revival of Irene starring Debbie Reynolds.

His first leading film role was the independent science fiction comedy The Twonky in 1953. Two years later, Conried appeared as a riverboat gambler in Davy Crockett, King of the Wild Frontier. His other live action films include The 5,000 Fingers of Dr. T and The Shaggy D.A.

Personal life
Conried married Margaret Grant on January 29, 1942; they had four children.

Death
Conried had a long history of heart problems and suffered a stroke in 1974 and a mild heart attack in 1979. He remained active until his death on January 5, 1982, one day after suffering a major heart attack. His body was donated to medical science.

Filmography

Dramatic School (1938) as Ramy
Never Say Die (1939) as Bit Part (uncredited)
It's a Wonderful World (1939) as Delmonico, Stage Manager
On Borrowed Time (1939) as Man in Convertible (uncredited)
Dulcy (1940) as Vincent Leach
The Great Dictator (1940) as Undetermined Role (uncredited)
Bitter Sweet (1940) as Rudolph – Man at Mama Luden's (uncredited)
Maisie Was a Lady (1941) as Georgie Porgie – House Guest (uncredited)
They Met in Argentina (1941) as Guitar Player in Cantina (uncredited)
Underground (1941) as Herman – Underground Member (uncredited)
Unexpected Uncle (1941) as Clayton – Manager at Brocks (uncredited)
Weekend for Three (1941) as Desk Clerk
More About Nostradamus (1941) (uncredited)
The Gay Falcon (1941) as Herman (uncredited)
A Date with the Falcon as Desk Clerk (uncredited)
Joan of Paris (1942) as Second Gestapo Agent (uncredited)
Blondie's Blessed Event (1942) as George Wickley
Saboteur (1942) as Edward (uncredited)
The Wife Takes a Flyer (1942) as Hendrik Woverman
Pacific Rendezvous (1942) as Park Hotel Desk Clerk (uncredited)
The Falcon Takes Over (1942) as Quincey W. Marriot (uncredited)
The Big Street (1942) as Louie – Headwaiter (uncredited)
The Greatest Gift (1942, short subject) as Father Fabian (uncredited)
Once Upon a Honeymoon (1942) as Vienna Tailor's Fitter (uncredited)
Nightmare (1942) as Hans – Nazi Agent
Underground Agent (1942) as Hugo
Hitler's Children (1943) as Dr. Graf
Journey into Fear (1943) as Swami Magician
Hostages (1943) as Lt. Glasenapp
A Lady Takes a Chance (1943) as Gregg Stone
Crazy House (1943) as Roco
His Butler's Sister (1943) as Reeves
Passage to Marseille (1944) as Jourdain (uncredited)
Mrs. Parkington (1944) as Mr. Ernst
Sliphorn King of Polaroo (1945, short subject) as Narrator (voice)
Woody Dines Out (1945, short subject) as Taxidermist (voice, uncredited)
The Reckless Driver (1946, short subject) as Wally Walrus (one line) (voice, uncredited)
The Senator Was Indiscreet (1947) as Waiter
Variety Time (1948) as Rudy La Paix
Design for Death (1948) as Narrator (Japanese)
The Barkleys of Broadway (1949) as Ladislaus Ladi 
My Friend Irma (1949) as Prof. Kropotkin
Bride for Sale (1949) as Jewelry Salesman (uncredited)
On the Town (1949) as François – Head Waiter (uncredited)
One Hour in Wonderland (1950) as Slave in the Magic Mirror
Nancy Goes to Rio (1950) as Alfredo
Summer Stock (1950) as Harrison I. Keath
New Mexico (1951) as Abraham Lincoln
Rich, Young and Pretty (1951) as Jean – Maitre D'
Behave Yourself! (1951) as Norbert 'Gillie the Blade' Gillespie
Texas Carnival (1951) as Hotel Clerk
Too Young to Kiss (1951) as Mr. Sparrow
I'll See You in My Dreams (1951) as William Rossiter (uncredited)
The Light Touch (1951) as Leopold (uncredited)
The World in His Arms (1952) as Eustace – Hotel Clerk
3 for Bedroom C (1952) as Jack Bleck – Press Agent
Big Jim McLain (1952) as Robert Henried
I Love Lucy (1952) as English Professor Mr. Livermore and as junk dealer 
Peter Pan (1953) as Captain Hook/Mr. George Darling (voice)
Johann Mouse (1953, short subject) as Narrator (voice)
The Emperor's New Clothes (1953, short subject) as Various (voice)
Siren of Bagdad (1953) as Ben Ali
The Twonky (1953) as Kerry West
The 5,000 Fingers of Dr. T (1953) as Dr. Terwilliker
The Affairs of Dobie Gillis (1953) as Professor Amos Pomfritt
Ben and Me (1953, short subject) as Thomas Jefferson / Crook (voice)
Davy Crockett, King of the Wild Frontier (1955) as Thimblerig
The Miracle on 34th Street (1955) as Mr. Shellhammer [TV adaptation]
You're Never Too Young (1955) as François (uncredited)
The Birds and the Bees (1956) as Duc Jacques de Montaigne
Bus Stop (1956) as Life Magazine Photographer
Carnival in Munich (1956, short subject) as Narrator
The Story of Anyburg U.S.A. (1957, short subject) as Prosecutor (voice, uncredited)
The Woody Woodpecker Show (1957) as Wally Walrus
The Monster That Challenged the World (1957) as Dr. Jess Rogers
Jet Pilot (1957) as Colonel Matoff (originally filmed in 1949)
 The Big Beat (1958) as Vladimir Skilsky
Maverick (1958) (episode – Black Fire) as Homer Eakins
Rock-A-Bye Baby (1958) as Mr. Wright
Sleeping Beauty (1959) (As live action model for animators to use as a guide) as King Stefan/Lord Duke (voice, uncredited)
Juke Box Rhythm (1959) as Balenko
The Real McCoys (1959) (episode – The Actor) as Sterling Ames 
The Alphabet Conspiracy (1959, short subject) as Mad Hatter
1001 Arabian Nights (1959) as The Wicked Wazir (voice)
The Real McCoys (1959) (episode – The Actor) as Mr. Ames
The Magic Fountain (1961) as Otto the Owl (voice)
The Bullwinkle Show (1961) as Snidely Whiplash (voice)
Mister Ed (1962) (episode – Ed and Paul Revere) as Igor
Fractured Flickers (1963–1964, 26 episodes) as Host
My Six Loves (1963) as Kinsley Kross
Robin and the 7 Hoods (1964) as Mr. Ricks – Architect (uncredited)
The Patsy (1964) as Prof. Mulerr
Gilligan's Island (1964–1965, 2 episodes) as Wrongway Feldman
Hoppity Hooper (1961–1966, 104 episodes) as Professor Waldo Wigglesworth (voice)
Hogan's Heroes (1966, episode #15) as Major Bonacelli
Lost in Space (1967, 1 episode) as Sagramonte
The Cricket on the Hearth (1967) as Tackleton (voice)
Wake Me When the War Is Over (1969, TV) as Professor Herman Erhardt
The Phantom Tollbooth (1970) as King Azaz/The MathemaGician (voice)
Horton Hears a Who! (1970) as Narrator/Horton/Dr. H. Hoovey (voice)
O'Hara, U.S. Treasury (1972) (episode – Operation: Dorias) as Count Anton Brelius
Dr. Seuss on the Loose (1973) as Narrator/North-going Zax/South-going Zax (voice)
The Brothers O'Toole (1973) as Polonius Vandergelt
"Amazing Grace" (1974) as Gov. Andy Wallace
Kolchak: The Night Stalker (1975) (episode – The Knightly Murders) as Mendel Boggs
The Shaggy D.A. (1976) as Professor Whatley
The Magic Pony (1977) as Spalnik (voice)
The Hobbit (1977) as Thorin Oakenshield (voice)
Halloween Is Grinch Night (1977) as The Grinch/Narrator (voice)
Quark (1977) as The Source (voice)
The Cat from Outer Space (1978) as Dr. Heffel
Every Girl Should Have One (1978) as Various (voices)
Alice (1979, 2 episodes) as Randolph Briggs
Oh, God! Book II (1980) as Dr. Barnes
Drak Pack (1980, 16 episodes) as Dr. Dread (voice)
Scruffy (1980) as Joe Tibbles/Solo the Scottish Terrier (voice)
Faeries (1981) as Faerie King/Shadow (voice)
The Trolls and the Christmas Express (1981) as Troglo (voice)
Spider-Man and His Amazing Friends (1981) as Chameleon (voice)
Miss Switch to the Rescue (1982) as Mordo, the Warlock (voice) (final appearance)

References

Further reading

External links

 
 
 
 
 
 Hans Conried radiography at Radio Gold Index 

1917 births
1982 deaths
20th-century American male actors
20th-century American male singers
20th-century American singers
Disney people
American male film actors
American male musical theatre actors
American male radio actors
American male stage actors
American male voice actors
American people of Austrian-Jewish descent
American people of English descent
Audiobook narrators
Columbia University School of the Arts alumni
Male actors from Baltimore
United States Army personnel of World War II
United States Army soldiers